Qu  is a Chinese surname. The surname Qu (瞿) is listed among the Hundred Family Surnames book of common Chinese surnames, compiled during the Song Dynasty.

Notable people 
Notable people with the surname include:
Annie Qu (瞿培勇, ? - ), Professor of Statistics, University of California, Irvine
Qu You (瞿佑, 1341–1427), a Chinese novelist who lived in the Ming Dynasty

See also
 Chinese Surnames
 Han Chinese

Chinese-language surnames
Individual Chinese surnames